Norman Mackie Scott (March 19, 1892 – October, 1981) was a Canadian a figure skater who competed in both single skating and pair skating.

Biography
Norman Scott's pairs partner in figure skating was Jeanne Chevalier. As a single skater, he is the 1914 and 1920 Canadian champion. He and Chevalier won the 1914 Canadian pairs title. Scott was part of the four teams that won the silver medal in the Canadian fours championships in 1913.

Scott also competed in the United States and won the first United States Figure Skating Championships in both singles and pairs.

While attending McGill University in Montreal Scott played on the school ice hockey team and was a member of the 1911–12 Canadian intercollegiate championship team. He had previously also played hockey in the Ottawa City Hockey League. While still in his teens he was said to have been given a big offer to join the Ottawa Senators of the National Hockey Association.

Outside of figure skating and ice hockey Scott was also a competitive golf player, representing the Royal Ottawa Golf Club.

During World War I he saw active combat in France with the Royal Air Force.

Results
men's singles

pairs with Chevalier

References

General references
 
   
Canadian Championships historical results, 1905-2006 (PDF)

American male pair skaters
American male single skaters
Canadian male pair skaters
Canadian male single skaters
1892 births
1981 deaths